Rickie John Sorensen (August 26, 1946 – August 24, 1994) was an American child actor.

Biography 
He was born in Los Angeles on August 26, 1946, the son of Mr. and Mrs. John M. Sorensen. His acting career began in 1956 when he was 10 years old. One of his most notable roles was as one of the voices of the child King Arthur in Disney's The Sword in the Stone. He was also known for portraying Tommy Banks in the main cast of the television series  Father of the Bride.  In 1974 he married Marianne Rubacha and had four children. He was diagnosed with cancer in February 1990, and died on August 24, 1994.

Filmography

References

External links

1946 births
1994 deaths
American male child actors
Deaths from cancer in California
American male film actors
Male actors from Los Angeles
20th-century American male actors
Burials at Forest Lawn Memorial Park (Long Beach)